Wilford Daniel White (born February 9, 1952) is an American former professional football player and coach. He played as a quarterback and punter for the Dallas Cowboys in the National Football League (NFL). He later coached in the Arena Football League (AFL). He has been the color commentator for Cowboys games on Compass Media Networks' America's Team Radio Network since the 2011 season. He played college football at Arizona State University.

Early years
A graduate of Westwood High School in Mesa, Arizona, White did not receive a lot of notice while being the starter at quarterback, due to his perception as a better baseball prospect.

Frank Kush, then the football head coach at Arizona State University, helped convince Bobby Winkles, the school's baseball coach, to sign White to a scholarship with the provision that he would also play punter for the football team. During those early years Kush gave him a chance to improve his skills as a quarterback, which eventually would lead him to become the starter midway through his sophomore season, ending up throwing for six touchdowns in a game against the University of New Mexico.

White went on to have a stellar career as a quarterback and punter, compiling a 32–4 record, winning three Fiesta Bowls, setting seven NCAA passing records and being named an All-American in 1973, when he led the nation's second rated total offense. He finished with 6,717 passing yards, 64 touchdowns, 42 interceptions and averaged 41.7 yards per punt.

Besides having his jersey retired, he was inducted into the College Football Hall of Fame, the State of Arizona Sports Hall of Fame, and the Arizona State University Athletics Hall of Fame. In 2000, he was named Arizona Athlete of the Century by the Arizona Republic. He also was an inaugural member of Dunham and Miller Hall of Fame.

On October 29, 2010, White was honored, along with other Sun Devil Quarterbacks, at a Legends Luncheon hosted by the Arizona State University Alumni Association and Sun Devil Club.  Other honorees included John F. Goodman, Andrew Walter, and Jake Plummer.

Professional career

Memphis Southmen (WFL)
The Dallas Cowboys selected him in the third round (53rd overall) of the 1974 NFL Draft, but were mainly interested in him as a punter, so he chose to sign with the World Football League's Memphis Southmen for a better offer.

White shared the quarterback position with John Huarte, helping his team reach the semifinals as a rookie and a second-place finish in 1975. During these two years, he passed for 2,635 yards and 21 touchdowns in 30 games, and also led the league in punting his last year.

Dallas Cowboys
In 1976, he signed with the Dallas Cowboys after the World Football League folded. Through 1979, White was the Cowboys' punter and the backup to the team's star quarterback Roger Staubach. After Staubach's retirement following the end of that season, White became the Cowboys' starting quarterback. Until 1984, he continued to serve as the team's punter, making him one of the last starting quarterbacks in NFL history to also start at a different position.  He punted for the last time in his career once in 1985.

In a memorable 1980 playoff game against the Atlanta Falcons, led the Cowboys to a come-from-behind 30–27 victory. He also played in one of the Cowboys' most painful playoff losses against the San Francisco 49ers in the 1981 NFC Championship Game, famous for the Joe Montana-to-Dwight Clark game-winning play, which would simply come to be known as "The Catch". He received Pro Bowl and second-team All-Pro honors in 1982.

White led the Cowboys to three consecutive NFC Championship Games (1980–1982), but was criticized after the Cowboys lost each of the three games despite having been favored in all of them. He also received criticism for publicly siding with the owners during the 1982 NFL Players Strike. Fans and teammates alike began to show support for him to be replaced as the Cowboys quarterback by Gary Hogeboom, who was coming off an impressive performance in the 1982 NFC Championship Game (which they lost to the archrival Washington Redskins) after White was knocked out of the game with a concussion. Even his statistically career-best 1983 season failed to silence the critics, after ending it with consecutive blowout losses to the Redskins (at home) and the 49ers after a 12–2 start. To add insult to injury, the Cowboys lost the NFC Wildcard Playoff game to the Los Angeles Rams. That apparently was enough for him to lose his starting job to Hogeboom at the start of the 1984 season. Under Hogeboom, the Cowboys looked impressive with a 4–1 start, but then a loss to division rival St. Louis and ineffective plays by Hogeboom convinced coach Tom Landry to reinstate White as his starter. The Cowboys finished 9–7, but missed the playoffs in 1984 for the first time in a decade; but with White as quarterback, the Cowboys made it back in 1985 with a 10–6 record. However, they lost again to the Los Angeles Rams in the playoffs.

In 1986, the Cowboys started 6–2, had the #1 offense in the NFL, were tied for the lead in the NFC Eastern Division and White was also the number one rated passer in the NFC at that point in the season. During an away game against Bill Parcells's New York Giants, however, a blind-side sack by Giants linebacker Carl Banks broke White's throwing wrist and tore ligaments, knocking him out of the game and ending his season. Dallas lost the game, 17–14, and without him the team faded badly, finishing the year 7–9 and the Cowboys first losing season since 1965.

White returned as the starter at the beginning of 1987, but after inconsistent play, he was benched in favor of Steve Pelluer for 4 of the final 6 games. In 1988, Pelluer won the starting job in training camp, relegating White as a backup. White appeared briefly in only two games, and in his second game he suffered a season-ending knee injury. An option on his contract was not picked up in April 1989 and he retired, paving the way for Troy Aikman to take the reins of the struggling franchise.

White had 1,761 completions on 2,950 attempts for 21,959 yards, 155 touchdowns, and 132 interceptions in his career.  He also gained  482 yards and scored 8 touchdowns rushing. Unusual for a quarterback, he had two pass receptions for touchdowns, both from a halfback option pass. On special teams he punted 610 times for 24,509 yards, an average of 40.4 yards per punt, with 144 punts inside the 20 and 77 touchbacks. His record as the Cowboys' starting quarterback was 62–32 (.659 winning percentage) during the regular season, and 5–5 in the playoffs.

Being Roger Staubach's successor and never reaching a Super Bowl as a starting quarterback contributed to White's being an unappreciated player, even considering all of the successes he achieved for the Cowboys and the NFL during the decade of the eighties. "I don't think anybody could have followed Roger and done as well as Danny", Coach Tom Landry remarked, "Danny was a solid winner."

NFL career statistics

Regular season

Coaching career
White's career as a coach began shortly after his playing days ended. This is appropriate considering that, while an active player, he was widely regarded—like Staubach before him—as knowledgeable of the game and as something of a coach on the field. He also began working as a broadcast commentator during his coaching career, which was possible because he coached Arena football, which is played during the outdoor game's off-season.

White served as the head coach of the Arizona Rattlers from 1992 to 2004, winning the ArenaBowl championship in 1994 and 1997. White's contract was not renewed by the new Rattlers ownership after the 2004 season following three consecutive ArenaBowl losses. He was named the head coach of the Arena Football League expansion Utah Blaze, which began play in 2006. He led his teams to the playoffs in 10 of 11 seasons, including two championships (1994 and 1997), finishing with a 162–95 record as a head coach.

In 2002, he was inducted into the Arena Football League Hall of Fame in recognition for his coaching success.

Head coaching record

Personal life
White's father, Wilford "Whizzer" White (no relation to college football legend and U.S. Supreme Court justice Byron White, who also was nicknamed "Whizzer" and played American football), was the first Arizona State University All-American football player and still ranks third in school history with 1502 rushing yards in a season (1950), he also played halfback for the Chicago Bears from 1951–52.

In 1983, White briefly recorded as a country music artist for the Grand Prix label. His only single, "You're a Part of Me", a duet with Linda Nail, reached #85 on the Hot Country Songs charts.

White and his wife, JoLynn, have four children, Ryan (d. 2015), Geoff, Heather and Reed, and sixteen grandchildren. He now makes corporate appearances and motivational speeches. JoLynn died on August 15, 2016. White has since remarried to Jane. In recent years he has been seen on TV doing ADT security infomercials.

White is a member of the Church of Jesus Christ of Latter-day Saints.

See also
 List of NCAA major college football yearly passing leaders

References

External links
 
 
 
 Coaching Page on ArenaFan.com

1952 births
Living people
American football punters
American football quarterbacks
American Latter Day Saints
Arena football announcers
Arizona Rattlers coaches
Arizona State Sun Devils football players
College Football Hall of Fame inductees
Dallas Cowboys announcers
Dallas Cowboys players
Memphis Southmen players
National Conference Pro Bowl players
National Football League announcers
Players of American football from Arizona
Sportspeople from Mesa, Arizona
Utah Blaze coaches